A burrito is a Mexican dish made from a flour tortilla wrapped around a choice of various fillings.

Burrito (little donkey) may also refer to:

 Jorge Daniel Hernández (born 1989), Mexican footballer, nicknamed "Burrito"
 Juan Manuel Martínez (born 1989), Argentine footballer, nicknamed "Burrito"
 Ariel Ortega (born 1974), Argentine footballer, nicknamed "El Burrito"
 Burrito, a character in the animated Disney short The Flying Gauchito
 "Burrito", an episode of We Bare Bears
 "Burrito", a song by Seether from the album Karma and Effect
 "Burrito", one of the common names in Spanish for bettles in the genus Rhyephenes 
 "Burritos", a song by Sublime from the album Sublime (album)

See also
 

Lists of people by nickname